The Alderson Bridge, also known as Alderson Memorial Bridge, is a historic concrete arch bridge in Alderson, West Virginia. It crosses the Greenbrier River, which separates Greenbrier and Monroe counties. The bridge once carried Monroe Street but is now closed to vehicular traffic (open to pedestrians). It was built in 1914, and measures 21 feet wide including the walkways and 453 feet long.

It was listed on the National Register of Historic Places in 1991. It is located in the Alderson Historic District, listed in 1993.

References

External links
 History of the Alderson Bridge

Road bridges on the National Register of Historic Places in West Virginia
Buildings and structures in Greenbrier County, West Virginia
Buildings and structures in Monroe County, West Virginia
Bridges completed in 1914
Transportation in Monroe County, West Virginia
Transportation in Greenbrier County, West Virginia
National Register of Historic Places in Greenbrier County, West Virginia
1914 establishments in West Virginia
National Register of Historic Places in Monroe County, West Virginia
Individually listed contributing properties to historic districts on the National Register in West Virginia
Concrete bridges in the United States
Arch bridges in the United States